Gino Cantarelli (1899 – 1950) was an Italian Dadaist poet and painter of the early 20th century. He was associated first with Futurism, then with Dada. He often wrote his poems in French.

Born in Mantua, from 1917 to 1920 Cantarelli published the journal Procellaria, together with Aldo Fiozzi, a publication which combined Futurist and Dadaist tendencies. In 1920 the two editors joined with Julius Evola to publish Bleu, which was devoted entirely to Dada and which appeared in Mantua, like the earlier journal.

References
Bohn, Willard. The Dada Market. 1993, Southern Illinois University Press. An anthology of Dada poetry, which includes a short biographical entry on Gino Cantarelli as well as including three of his Dadaist poems, all three written in French.
"Professor Joaquim Molas: memòria, escriptura, història ( LITERATURA DEL SEGLE XX ) eBook", Edicions Universitat Barcelona

Dada
Italian male poets
1899 births
1950 deaths
20th-century Italian painters
20th-century Italian male artists
Italian male painters
20th-century Italian poets
20th-century Italian male writers
19th-century Italian male artists